The Battle of Hastings is the twelfth album by the British Canterbury scene progressive rock band Caravan, released in 1995.

Track listing 

 "It's a Sad, Sad Affair" (Pye Hastings) – 3:23
 "Somewhere in Your Heart" (Hastings) – 5:42
 "Cold as Ice" (Hastings) – 4:09
 "Liar" (Hastings) – 6:07
 "Don't Want Love" (Pye Hastings, Jimmy Hastings) – 6:48
 "Travelling Ways" (Dave Sinclair) – 3:51
 "This Time" (Hastings) – 5:19
 "If It Wasn't for Your Ego" (Hastings) – 3:36
 "It's Not Real" (Hastings) – 5:29
 "Wendy Wants Another 6" Mole" (Hastings) – 2:25
 "I Know Why You're Laughing" (Hastings) – 5:32

Personnel 
Caravan
 Pye Hastings – lead vocals, acoustic & electric guitar, Leslie guitar, harmony vocals
 Geoff Richardson – viola, violin, clarinet, acoustic & electric guitar, mandolin, tambourine, wind, kalimba, shaker, amplifiers, harmony vocals
 Dave Sinclair – keyboards, harmony vocals
 Jim Leverton – bass guitar, harmony vocals; lead vocals on "Travelling Ways"
 Richard Coughlan – drums

Additional personnel
 Jimmy Hastings – flute, piccolo flute, alto flute, bass flute, clarinet, soprano sax, tenor sax

Releases information 
 1999: Castle 520
 1996: CD HTD 41
 2002: CD Castle 72042
 1995: CD Castle 41

References

External links 
 Calyx, The Canterbury Website
 Caravan - The Battle of Hastings (1995) album review by Bruce Eder, credits & releases at AllMusic.com
 Caravan - The Battle of Hastings (1995) album releases & credits at Discogs.com
 Caravan - The Battle of Hastings (1995) album credits & user reviews at ProgArchives.com
 Caravan - The Battle of Hastings (1995) album to be listened as stream at Play.Spotify.com

1995 albums
Caravan (band) albums